Beaver Pass, elev. 1070 m (3510 ft), is a pass in the hillcountry of the northern Cariboo Plateau forming a divide between Lightning Creek (S) and Tregillus Creek, part of the Willow River drainage (N), located just northwest of Beaver Pass House, a locality along the route of BC Highway 26, which leads to Barkerville and Wells from its start at its junction with the Cariboo Highway (97) at the city of Quesnel.

References

Mountain passes of British Columbia
Landforms of the Cariboo